Sadler is a city in Grayson County, Texas, United States. The population was 343 at the 2010 census, down from 404 at the 2000 census. It is part of the Sherman–Denison Metropolitan Statistical Area.

Geography

Sadler is located in western Grayson County at  (33.681387, –96.846321). The U.S. Route 82 freeway runs through the southern part of the city, leading east  to Sherman, the county seat, and west  to Whitesboro.

Climate

The climate in this area is characterized by hot, humid summers and generally mild to cool winters.  According to the Köppen Climate Classification system, Sadler has a humid subtropical climate, abbreviated "Cfa" on climate maps.

Demographics

As of the census of 2000, there were 404 people, 167 households, and 112 families residing in the city. The population density was 673.4 people per square mile (260.0/km). There were 177 housing units at an average density of 295.0 per square mile (113.9/km). The racial makeup of the city was 98.76% White, 0.25% African American and 0.99% Native American. Hispanic or Latino of any race were 0.99% of the population.

There were 167 households, of which 29.3% had children under the age of 18 living with them, 54.5% were married couples living together, 8.4% had a female householder with no husband present, and 32.9% were non-families. 30.5% of all households were made up of individuals, and 15.0% had someone living alone who was 65 years of age or older. The average household size was 2.42 and the average family size was 3.04.

Of the city's population, 25.7% were under the age of 18, 7.4% aged between 18 and 24, 25.5% between 25 to 44, 26.2% between 45 to 64, and 15.1% who were 65 or older. The median age was 38. For every 100 females, there were 94.2 males. For every 100 females age 18 and over, there were 87.5 males.

The median income for a household in the city was $26,250, and the median income for a family was $29,250. Males had a median income of $30,893 versus $21,667 for females. The per capita income for the city was $15,302. About 11.9% of families and 14.7% of the population were below the poverty line, including 17.2% of those under age 18 and 7.8% of those age 65 or over.

Education
Sadler is served by the S and S Consolidated Independent School District.

References

External links

Cities in Grayson County, Texas
Cities in Texas